The men's 15 kilometre classical at the 1999 Asian Winter Games was held on January 31, 1999 at Yongpyong Cross Country Venue, South Korea.

Schedule
All times are Korea Standard Time (UTC+09:00)

Results
Legend
DSQ — Disqualified

References

Results

External links
Results FIS

Men 15